Anna May Wong (1905–1961) was an American actress of Chinese heritage, who grew up in a culturally diverse neighborhood  adjacent to Chinatown, Los Angeles. Her father believed in exposing his family to the creative arts, and often took them to see traditional Chinese stage productions. Young Anna, however, was fascinated by the emerging film industry in the area, and would fantasize herself as a movie actress like Pearl White or Mary Pickford. Her daydreams began to look like an achievable goal when local Baptist minister James Wang, who often worked with the film productions, recommended her as an extra in the Alla Nazimova silent production of The Red Lantern. Wong was only 14 years old, and eventually left school before graduating. While still a teenager, she was cast in the lead role of Lotus Flower in The Toll of the Sea.

Wong worked during an era when East Asian Americans were cast in a negative light, and often played in film by non-East Asian actors who used yellow make-up on their skin and tape on their eyelids to mimic what the industry believed passed as Asian facial features. In spite of having the starring lead and top billing in the 1931 film Daughter of the Dragon, she was paid only half as much as Warner Oland, a non-Asian actor who played her father (the villain Fu Manchu) and had far less screen time. Oland was often cast as an Asian on screen, most notably in numerous films as Chinese detective Charlie Chan. Feeling like she was stereotyped and limited in the United States, Wong relocated to Germany for a few years. Back in the United States, DuMont Television Network created the short-lived The Gallery of Madame Liu-Tsong mystery series for her in 1951. From then until her death in 1961, Wong appeared on a handful of American television programs.

She made 60 or 61 films in her career, the first 40 of which were during the silent film era. Biographer Graham Russell Gao Hodges has noted that Just Joe, the final film attributed to her, might have actually been actress Marie Yang, usurping Wong's name for that production.

Wong received a star on the Hollywood Walk of Fame on February 8, 1960.

Filmography

Television

See also
Anna May Wong: In Her Own Words

References

Bibliography

External links

Anna May Wong at the New-York Historical Society Museum and Library

Actress filmographies
American filmographies